Vivian Ho is a journalist working for the Guardian US.

Career
Ho has worked for the west coast bureau of the Guardian US since 2018. Before that, she was a reporter for the San Francisco Chronicle for almost seven years, with a focus on crime and criminal justice. Prior to the Chronicle, she worked for the Boston Globe and the Worcester Telegram and Gazette as a reporter, and has bylines in Topic, San Francisco magazine, The Muse, Bustle and Marie Claire.

In 2019, her first book, Those Who Wander: America's Lost Street Kids, was published by Little A.

Personal
She was raised in New England.

Controversy
In 2009, Vivian Ho was profiled in her capacity as  Editor-in-Chief  of The Daily Free Press at Boston University.

In September 2011, Ho achieved notoriety when she was one of several journalists arrested while covering a protest of Bay Area Rapid Transit.  Ho was allegedly handcuffed after identifying herself as a journalist.  Her arrest drew criticism from the Chronicle.

In January 2012, Ho was again arrested covering the Occupy Oakland protest.

References

External links 
Vivian Ho's official twitter account

Living people
Writers from the San Francisco Bay Area
San Francisco Chronicle people
Activists from California
Year of birth missing (living people)